Uke may refer to:

People 
 Uke Clanton (1898–1960), Major League Baseball first baseman who played for one season. Nicknamed "Cat", he played for the Cleveland Indians for one game on September 21, 1922
 Uke Rugova
 Sıtkı Üke (1876–1941), officer of the Ottoman Army and the general of the Turkish Army

Places 
 Uke, Nigeria, village in Idemili Local Government area of Anambra State, Nigeria

Ukrainians 

 UKE, Untold History of Hockey Legends, originally:  - History of Victories of Free Ukrainians, film about Ukrainians - Stanley Cup winning players: Wayne Gretzky, Johnny Bucyk, Orest Kindrachuk, Ruslan Fedotenko, Ken Daneyko, Eric Nesterenko et al. 
 Uke, a.k.a. Ukrainian, a person identified with nationality of Ukraine

Other uses
 Abbreviation for Universitätsklinikum Hamburg-Eppendorf, see University Medical Center Hamburg-Eppendorf
 Uke (martial arts), role in training
 Uke, a submissive role in a relationship between males in yaoi or shōnen-ai media, derived from the martial arts term
 Ukulele, a musical instrument
 Mighty Uke, a 2010 documentary film about the ukulele
 Üké, Uke, or Ükä Tibetan, a term for the most widely understood dialect of Tibetan languages
 Uke Mochi, a goddess of food in the Shinto religion of Japan
 University Medical Center Hamburg-Eppendorf or UKE, a medical center in Germany

See also 
 Uki (disambiguation)